The 1950 Dutch TT was the third race of the 1950 Grand Prix motorcycle racing season. It took place on the weekend of 8 July 1950 at the TT Circuit Assen.

500 cc classification

350 cc classification

125 cc classification

References

Dutch TT
Dutch
Tourist Trophy